Bollywood & Beyond may refer to;

Film festivals
Bollywood and Beyond (Australia–New Zealand), a traveling Indian film festival, showing in Melbourne, Sydney, Adelaide in Australia and Auckland in New Zealand
Westpac Indian Film Festival of Sydney (aka Bollywood and Beyond), Sydney, NSW, Australia
Bollywood and Beyond, a programming segment at the London Asian Film Festival, London, England, UK; celebrating Indian film

Other uses
Bollywood & Beyond (radio); a commercial channel on XM Satellite Radio.

See also

 Bollywood (disambiguation)
 Beyond (disambiguation)